Episparis fenestrifera is a species of moth in the family Erebidae first described by Felix Bryk in 1915.

Distribution
The species is found in Cameroon, Nigeria and Sierra Leone.

References
Bryk, F. (1915). "Neue exotische, insbesondere aethiopische Schmetterlinge". Archiv für Naturgeschichte. 81 (A4) (4): 1–16, pl. 1. 

Pangraptinae